PHM may refer to:

 Prognostics and health management
 PulteGroup, NYSE stock symbol
 Penn-Harris-Madison School Corporation, Indiana, US
 Patrol Hydrofoil Missile, US Navy Hull classification symbol
 Pretty Hate Machine, the debut album from Nine Inch Nails
 Proto-Hmong–Mien language
 Pure homopolar motor, is an electric motor not requiring brushes, electronics, or semiconductor parts to convert direct current into torque.
 PHM Racing, a German auto racing team